Jafarabad (also Romanized as Ja‘farābād; also known as Ja‘farābād-e Jangal, Gachīābād-e Pā’īn and Gachīābād) is a village in Abali Rural District, Rudehen District, Damavand County, Tehran Province, Iran. At the 2006 census, its population was 19, in 10 families.

References 

Populated places in Damavand County